Senator Pate may refer to:

Louis M. Pate Jr. (born 1936), North Carolina State Senate
Paul Pate (born 1958), Iowa State Senate